The New China (eng: Liberated China) is a 1950 Soviet documentary film directed by Sergei Gerasimov. It was entered into the 1951 Cannes Film Festival.

References

External links

1950 films
1950 documentary films
1950s Russian-language films
Films directed by Sergei Gerasimov
Soviet documentary films
Documentary films about China
China–Soviet Union relations